The Association of Performing Arts Professionals (previously the Association of Performing Arts Presenters, also known as APAP), based in Washington, D.C., is the United States national service, advocacy and membership organization for the performing arts presenting sector and the convener of APAP|NYC, the world's leading gathering of performing arts professionals, every January in New York City.

Founded in 1957, APAP is a 501(c)(3) organization governed by a volunteer board of directors and led by President and CEO Lisa Richards Toney.

History
APAP's story begins in the 1950s when college and university concert managers directed their interests toward the educational role of the arts and the unique issues related to professional performing arts on campus. Fan Taylor, presenter at the Wisconsin Union Theater, became the founder of APAP. The University of Wisconsin in Madison initially housed the staff. During the 1960s and 1970s, the presenting field and membership expanded to a variety of organizations, prompting the association to change its name to the Association of College, University and Community Arts Administrators (ACUCAA) in 1973. By the mid-1980s, colleges and universities no longer dominated the membership, and the association's spectrum expanded. The organization's name was changed to the Association of Performing Arts Presenters in 1988. Fan Taylor led the organization for 24 years. Bill Dawson succeeded Taylor in 1971 and served until 1986, when Susie Farr became the third executive director until her departure in 1999. During her tenure the national office relocated to Washington, D.C. Sandra Gibson served as president and CEO from 2000 until 2011. In October 2011, the board of directors appointed Mario Garcia Durham as president and CEO, the fifth leader of APAP.

Membership
Membership in the association was 29 in 1957; by 1966 it had increased to 275. Today APAP has 1,600 organizational and individual members and serves more than 5,000 performing arts professionals every year. Today, the association represents the nonprofit and for-profit sectors of the presenting and touring industry of the performing arts in the U.S. and internationally, with member organizations from all 50 U.S. states and at least 50 countries. Members include large performing arts centers in major cities, outdoor festivals, rural community-focused organizations, academic institutions, individual artists, and artist managers and booking agents. Members represent disciplines including various forms of dance, music, theater, puppetry, circus, magic, attractions and performance art.

Programs

Through professional development programs and resources, APAP helps artists, agents, managers, presenters and producers to gain the knowledge, skills and strategies they need to make the arts a vibrant, valuable and sustainable part of everyday life. APAP enriches communities by supporting this work through grants, resources and advocacy aimed at making the arts accessible for all. APAP programs focus on broadening the impact of the performing arts to all audiences and to all citizens. As a founding member of the Performing Arts Alliance, APAP advocates for national policies that support, strengthen and improve the performing arts industry.

APAP|NYC 
The association holds an annual members-only conference in New York City every January called APAP|NYC. The 2017 event—the 60th anniversary of the conference—featured more than 1,000 artist showcase performances, and more than 3,680 arts professionals from 50 states and 36 countries attended.  extensive array of performing arts events and festivals take place each January in New York City. January 12–16, will greet more than 3,600 presenters, artists, managers, agents and emerging arts leaders for five days of professional development, business deals and exciting performances.

Professional development 
Through professional development programs and resources, APAP helps artists, agents, managers, presenters and producers to gain the knowledge, skills and strategies they need to make the arts a vibrant, valuable and sustainable part of everyday life. APAP provides year-round resources for Professional Development and Networking including access to the Membership Database, joining Fellowship programs, and monthly webinars.

Every January in New York City, APAP hosts [apapnyc.org], the world's leading gathering of performing arts professionals. A core component of this five-day-long event is professional development, with more than 80 sessions, including artist pitch sessions, pre-conference seminars, individual consultations, and plenary events with featured guest speakers.

Leadership programs 
Emerging Leadership Institute (2002–present):
Annual two-day intensive seminar for cohort of 20-30 emerging leaders at APAP|NYC.

Leadership Fellows Program (2015–present):
Leadership Fellows Program (LFP) is a 20-month-long program for mid-career professionals.

Leadership Development Institute (2009-2013):
Two cohorts of 10-15 mid-career professionals research "Mission/Vision" and "Connecting to Your Community" and produced the online interactive toolkit.

Monthly Webinar Series (2012–present): APAP hosts a monthly professional development webinar series designed specifically for arts professionals and free for all APAP members. These online seminars present discussions led by arts industry experts, innovators and creative leaders.

Young Performers Career Advancement (1996–Present): Taking place at APAP|NYC, the Young Performers Career Advancement Program (YPCA) is a series of intensive seminars designed to support classical musicians in the formative stages of their careers by offering opportunities to meet and work with established presenters, managers, agents and artists.

Grant programs 
APAP offers several grant programs exclusively for APAP members to provide financial support that recognizes outstanding and innovative practice.

Building Bridges (2013–Present): Building Bridges is a program that supports campus based presenters interested in building interdisciplinary cross campus and community collaborations that expand knowledge and understanding of Muslim societies.

Cultural Exchange Fund (2008–Present): The Cultural Exchange Fund is a travel subsidy program to assist U.S. based presenting professionals and artists in building partnerships and collaborations with international colleagues and to experience the work of artists from around the world in its cultural context.

Notes

External links
 APAP, official site

Professional associations based in the United States
Performing arts in the United States
1957 establishments in Washington, D.C.
Non-profit organizations based in Washington, D.C.
501(c)(3) organizations